A list of films produced in Pakistan in 1967 (see 1967 in film) and in the Urdu language:

1967

See also
 1967 in Pakistan

References

External links
 Search Pakistani film - IMDB.com

1967
Lists of 1967 films by country or language
Films